Neville Joseph "Nick" Whitehead  (29 May 1933 – 6 October 2002) was a Welsh sprinter.

Early life and career
Whitehead was born in Wrexham. He competed for Great Britain in the 1960 Summer Olympics in Rome in the 4 × 100 metres relay where he won the bronze medal with his teammates Peter Radford, David Jones and David Segal.  He went on to win a Commonwealth Bronze medal in Perth, Western Australia in 1962 as part of the Welsh Relay Team.

Later work
He would later teach Physical Education at Carnegie Physical Training College in Leeds, now part of Leeds Metropolitan University and eventually became Director of Development at the Sports Council for Wales (now Sport Wales). He was made an Officer of the Order of the British Empire (OBE) in the 1985 New Year Honours. He died, aged 69, in Newport, Pembrokeshire. He had a son Simon Whitehead and two daughters; Jane Roberts and Rachel Shiamh.

References

1933 births
2002 deaths
Welsh male sprinters
Olympic bronze medallists for Great Britain
Athletes (track and field) at the 1960 Summer Olympics
Olympic athletes of Great Britain
Athletes (track and field) at the 1962 British Empire and Commonwealth Games
Commonwealth Games bronze medallists for Wales
Commonwealth Games medallists in athletics
Officers of the Order of the British Empire
Sportspeople from Wrexham
Welsh Olympic medallists
Medalists at the 1960 Summer Olympics
Olympic bronze medalists in athletics (track and field)
Medallists at the 1962 British Empire and Commonwealth Games
Athletes (track and field) at the 1958 British Empire and Commonwealth Games